Michael Edward Vigil (born May 23, 1951) is an American attorney and jurist serving as a justice of the New Mexico Supreme Court. He formerly was a judge on the New Mexico Court of Appeals.

Early life and education 

Vigil was born in Santa Fe, New Mexico. He graduated from the Santa Fe University of Art and Design (formerly College of Santa Fe) in 1973 with a Bachelor of Arts in political science and a history minor. He received his Juris Doctor from the Georgetown University Law Center in 1976.

Career 

Vigil began his legal career in 1976 as a staff attorney for the New Mexico Court of Appeals. He entered private practice in 1979, focusing on personal injury and medical malpractice. He was in private practice until his appointment to the Court of Appeals.

State judicial service 

Vigil was appointed to the New Mexico Court of Appeals in 2003 by Democratic Governor Bill Richardson. He was elected in 2004 and re-elected in 2012 to a term set to end December 31, 2020. Vigil was elected by his peers in 2015 to a two-year term as chief judge. His service on the appeals court terminated upon his election to the Supreme Court.

New Mexico Supreme Court 

Vigil was previously considered in 2015 for appointment to the New Mexico Supreme Court after the retirement of Richard C. Bosson. On November 6, 2018, Vigil was elected to the court, defeating incumbent Gary L. Clingman by a margin of 19%. His term began on January 1, 2019. On July 15, 2020, Vigil was sworn in as chief justice of the Supreme Court.

Personal 

Vigil has four children and three grandchildren.

References

External links 

|-

1959 births
20th-century American lawyers
21st-century American judges
Chief Justices of the New Mexico Supreme Court
Georgetown University Law Center alumni
Justices of the New Mexico Supreme Court
Living people
New Mexico Democrats
New Mexico lawyers
New Mexico state court judges
Place of birth missing (living people)
Santa Fe University of Art and Design alumni